Piar Municipality is a municipality in Monagas State, Venezuela. In the north it borders Caripe Municipality.

History 

On 2021, Mariangellys Tillero was elected Major.

Climate
Minimum monthly temperature in the Piar municipality lies between 14.3 and 23.1 °C, while maximum temperature is between 23.9 and 33.3 °C. Total annual precipitation fluctuates between 1083 and 1898 mm. Most rain falls between June and August, while the driest quarter comprises February to April.

Culture

Festivities 
 Canavales La Maya (La Maya carvivals).

Mayor 
 Miguel Fuentes. (2008 - 2013), (2013 - 2017) PSUV.
 Mariangellys Tillero (2021 - 2025).

References

Municipalities of Monagas